The Christian Royer House is a historic home located at Westminster, Carroll County, Maryland, United States. It was built about 1828, and served dual functions as a farmhouse and a Church of the Brethren meeting house. The house is two stories of brick, with a five-bay by two-bay main section and a three-bay long central rear wing. The rear wing features a double-tiered inset porch on both sides in the two bays adjoining the main section of the house. Also on the property are a late 19th-century corn crib and a large 20th-century barn. The features distinguishing this as a meeting house are the double entrance on the main facade, the folding wood-panel partition walls that open to provide single large space and the extensive kitchen facilities.

The Christian Royer House was listed on the National Register of Historic Places in 1979.

References

External links
, including photo from 1979, at Maryland Historical Trust

Church of the Brethren
Houses on the National Register of Historic Places in Maryland
Houses in Carroll County, Maryland
Westminster, Maryland
National Register of Historic Places in Carroll County, Maryland
Pennsylvania Dutch culture in Maryland